Lowell N. Lewis (born July 9, 1931) was an American plant physiology professor. He began teaching plant physiology at University of California, Riverside in 1960. In 1963 he and graduate student Rashad Khalifah discovered a new kind of auxin present in citrus plants. He was promoted to associate professor of horticultural science in 1965. In 1971 he was appointed associate dean of the College of Natural and Agricultural Sciences by the dean, W. Mack Dugger. He left teaching in 1981 when he was appointed vice president of the Division of Agriculture and Natural Resources. In February 1989, he became director of biotechnology company Ecogen Inc. He continued to work for the University as Associate Vice President for Programs, Agriculture and Natural Resources until his retirement in April 1991. Lewis mentions in a self-published book that he was named coordinator of relations between the University of California and Catalonia by a 1995 bilateral academic agreement.

Selected published works

References

Further reading

1931 births
Pennsylvania State University alumni
Michigan State University alumni
University of California, Riverside faculty
American horticulturists
Plant physiologists
People from Kingston, Pennsylvania
Living people